The American Osteopathic Board of Neurology and Psychiatry (AOBNP) is an organization that provides board certification to qualified Doctors of Osteopathic Medicine (D.O.) and physicians who specialize in disorders of the nervous system (neurologists) and to qualified Doctors of Osteopathic Medicine and physicians who specialize in the diagnosis and treatment of mental disorders (psychiatrists).

The board is one of 16 medical specialty certifying boards of the American Osteopathic Association Bureau of Osteopathic Specialists (AOABOS) of the American Osteopathic Association (AOA). Established in 1941, the AOBNP is responsible for examining physicians who have completed an ACGME-accredited residency in neurology and/or psychiatry. Since its inception, over 630 physicians have achieved primary certification in psychiatry and 400 in neurology, along with physicians holding subspecialty certifications.

The purpose of the certification examination is to ensure that physicians who have completed the required training have a high level of competency and therefore can safely provide services to their patients which meets a well established standard of care. Physicians who successfully pass the examination are recommended by the AOBNP to the AOABOS for certification. The AOABOS holds the ultimate authority in conferring board certification.

The AOBNP is one of two certifying boards for neurologists and psychiatrists in the United States. The other certifying authority is the American Board of Psychiatry and Neurology, Inc. (ABPN), a member board of the American Board of Medical Specialties.

Organization
There are eight elected members of the AOBNP. Each member is an AOA board-certified physician, certified through the AOBNP. Membership includes a representatives from each area of neurology (4) and psychiatry (4), as well as representation from the subspecialties of the board and a representative from each of the time divisions of the United States whenever possible.

Board certification
Initial certification is available to osteopathic and other neurologists and psychiatrists who have successfully completed an ACGME-accredited residency in neurology or psychiatry and successful completion of the written exam.

Board certified neurologists and psychiatrists (diplomates of the AOBNP) must participate in Osteopathic Continuous Certification on an ongoing basis to avoid expiration of their board certified status.

Effective June 1, 2019, all AOA specialty certifying boards implemented an updated continuous certification process for osteopathic physicians, called “(OCC)”, and are required to publish the requirements for OCC in their basic documents. The following components comprise the updated OCC process:

 Component 1: Licensure. AOA board-certified physicians must hold a valid, active license to practice medicine in one of the 50 states or Canada.
 Component 2: Lifelong Learning/Continuing Medical Education. A minimum of 75 CME credits in the specialty area of certification during each 3-year cycle. Of these 75 specialty CME credits, 18 of these CME hours must be AOA Category 1-A. The remaining 57 hours will have broad acceptance of specialty CME.  
 Component 3: Cognitive Assessment: AOBA board-certified physicians must complete the online cognitive assessment annually after entry into the Longitudinal Assessment process to maintain compliance with OCC.
 Component 4: Practice Performance Assessment and Improvement. Attestation of participation in quality improvement activities. Physicians may view the Attestation Form by logging in with their AOA credentials to the AOA Physician Portal on the AOA website. 

Diplomates of the AOBNP may also receive Subspecialty Certification or Certification of Special Qualifications in the following areas:
 Addiction Medicine
 Neurophysiology
 Geriatric Psychiatry
 Hospice and Palliative Medicine
 Sleep Medicine

Effective July 1, 2020, allopathic (MD) physicians may apply for certification by the AOBA.

See also
 AOA Bureau of Osteopathic Specialists
 American Board of Psychiatry and Neurology

References

External links
 AOBNP homepage

Osteopathic medical associations in the United States
Organizations established in 1941
Neurology organizations
Psychiatric associations
Mental health organizations in Illinois
Medical and health professional associations in Chicago